Banco Central Hispano was a Spanish bank. In 1999 it was merged with Banco Santander to form Banco Santander Central Hispano. However the bank group was reverted to refer as Santander Group or Banco Santander in 2007.

See also
 Former Banco Central Hispano headquarters

References

Defunct banks of Spain
Banco Santander